Pier59 Studios is a multimedia fashion studio, located at Chelsea Piers in New York City. At 110,000 square feet, it is considered to be the largest commercial photography/multimedia studio in the world.

The studio was established in 1995 by its founder, Federico Pignatelli, with the goal of transforming the location into the premier studio in Chelsea, Manhattan.

References 

Photographic studios
Companies based in New York City